Cyrano is a 2021 musical romantic drama film directed by Joe Wright and with a screenplay by Erica Schmidt, based on Schmidt's 2018 stage musical of the same name, itself based on the 1897 Edmond Rostand play Cyrano de Bergerac. The film stars Peter Dinklage, Haley Bennett, Kelvin Harrison Jr., and Ben Mendelsohn.

Cyrano had its world premiere at the 48th Telluride Film Festival on 2 September 2021, had a one-week theatrical run in Los Angeles on 17 December 2021, and was released in the United States and the United Kingdom on 25 February 2022. This is MGM's last picture released before the acquisition of the studio by Amazon. The film was a box office disappointment, grossing $6.4 million on a $30 million budget. However, it received generally positive reviews, with critics praising Dinklage's and Bennett's performances and the soundtrack. It was nominated for several awards, including a Best Motion Picture – Musical or Comedy and Best Actor in a Motion Picture – Musical or Comedy (Dinklage) at the 79th Golden Globe Awards, four nominations at the 75th British Academy Film Awards and a Best Costume Design nod at the 94th Academy Awards.

Plot
Beautiful, but penniless, orphan Roxanne attends the theater with the vain and showy Duke De Guiche, who is in love with her. He is determined to marry her, but Roxanne wishes to marry for love. As the play begins, Roxanne's childhood friend, the dwarven Cyrano de Bergerac, objects to the lead actor and chases him off the stage with rhyming insults, then duels a man who mocks Cyrano's physical condition.

Roxanne fails to realize that Cyrano is desperately in love with her. She tells Cyrano she has fallen for Christian and asks him to arrange a meeting. Though heartbroken, Cyrano meets Christian and discovers he is inarticulate and incapable of expressing his feelings. Not wanting to disappoint Roxanne, he writes countless letters expressing his own deep feelings for her, which Christian delivers as his own writing.

When Christian and Roxanne meet in person, he is unable to match Cyrano's powerful words that caused her to fall in love with Christian; instead he inadvertently insults her. Roxanne declares she needs more than simple platitudes and storms off. Later, Cyrano helps Christian make amends by hiding in the shadows and whispering what to say to Roxanne. She forgives Christian as a priest delivers a letter from De Guiche, declaring that he will either marry her or have his way with her. Roxanne and Christian hastily marry, infuriating De Guiche, infuriated, who arranges for Christian and Cyrano's unit to be sent to the war front.

While at war, Cyrano sends Roxanne a letter from Christian every day and risks his own life to keep Christian alive for Roxanne. De Guiche eventually sends their unit on a suicide mission, and Cyrano reveals he has already written a final letter to Roxanne. Christian sees the letter is stained with tears and realizes Cyrano loves Roxanne, and that the man Roxanne really loves is Cyrano. He asks Cyrano to tell Roxanne everything. He then runs out to meet the enemy's guns and is killed.

Three years later, Cyrano is impoverished and in ill-health from war wounds that never fully healed. Roxanne remains his close friend. Sensing he is about to die, Cyrano meets with Roxanne and asks for Christian's final letter. He recites it from memory, revealing he wrote all of Christian's letters; Roxanne declares her love for Cyrano before he dies peacefully.

Cast

 Peter Dinklage as Cyrano de Bergerac
 Haley Bennett as Roxanne
 Kelvin Harrison Jr. as Christian de Neuvillette
 Ben Mendelsohn as De Guiche
 Monica Dolan as Marie, Roxanne's attendant
 Bashir Salahuddin as Le Bret
 Joshua James as Valvert
 Anjana Vasan as Sister Claire
 Ruth Sheen as Mother Marthe
 Glen Hansard, Sam Amidon, and Scott Folan appear as a singing trio of guards, credited respectively as guard #1, guard #2, and guard #3.
 Mark Benton as Montfleury
 Richard McCabe as Priest
 Peter Wight as Ragueneau
 Tim McMullan as Jodelet
 Mark Bagnall as stranger
 Mike Shepherd as Marquis
 Paul Biddiss as the gate keeper
 Katy Owen as the thief

Production

It was announced in August 2020 that Metro-Goldwyn-Mayer had acquired the rights to the film, which was written by Erica Schmidt, based on her stage musical Cyrano. The film was produced by Working Title Films, and Joe Wright was set to direct. Peter Dinklage and Haley Bennett will reprise their roles from the stage musical, with Ben Mendelsohn and Brian Tyree Henry also cast. Kelvin Harrison Jr. joined the cast in September 2020. Bashir Salahuddin later joined the cast to replace Henry. Music for the film was written by members of the National, who also wrote the music and lyrics for the stage musical.

Principal photography began in Sicily (Noto, Syracuse, Scicli) in October 2020, during the COVID-19 pandemic in Italy. All of the vocal performances for the musical numbers were recorded live on set.

Music
The film's opening number, "Someone To Say," was released as a single on October 8, 2021, followed by "Somebody Desperate" on December 3, 2021. The latter song was written exclusively for the film and plays during the end credits. The soundtrack was released on Decca Records on December 10, 2021.

Release
The film had its world premiere at the Telluride Film Festival on September 2, 2021. By the end of its festival run, it screened at the Hamptons, Mill Valley, Rome, and Savannah.

The film was widely theatrically released in the United States and the United Kingdom on February 25, 2022. The film was originally scheduled for a limited theatrical release in the United States on December 25, 2021, but the release date was then moved to December 31. In November 2021, the film's release plans were changed by United Artists Releasing in an effort to better position itself for Academy Awards qualification and contention: it had an exclusive one-week theatrical run in Los Angeles on December 17, prior to a planned limited theatrical release on January 21, 2022, before expanding in subsequent weeks. The release date in the US was shifted to a limited release on January 28, before opening wide on February 11. It was shifted again to a solely wide release on February 25, without a limited release, on the same date as its release in the UK. The UK release was originally scheduled for release on January 14, but was postponed by Universal Pictures as a result of the COVID-19 pandemic response.

The film was released on streaming on March 9, 2022, and on Blu-ray and DVD on April 19, 2022, by Universal Pictures Home Entertainment.

It is also the last MGM title to be released before the studio was acquired by Amazon on March 17, 2022.

Reception

Box office 
Cyrano grossed $3.9million in the United States and Canada, and $2.5million in other territories, for a worldwide total of $6.4million.

In the United States and Canada, Cyrano was released alongside Studio 666, and was projected to gross $2–5 million from 797 theaters in its opening weekend. The film earned $1.4 million in its opening weekend, finishing ninth at the box office. It made $678,783 in its second weekend, finishing eighth. The film dropped out of the box office top ten in its third weekend, finishing eleventh with $398,932.

Outside the U.S. and Canada, the film earned $1.04 million from 10 international markets in its opening weekend.

Critical response

Accolades

References

External links
 
 
 
 Official screenplay

2021 romantic drama films
2020s American films
2020s British films
2020s Canadian films
2020s English-language films
2020s musical drama films
2020s romantic musical films
American musical drama films
American romantic drama films
American romantic musical films
British musical drama films
British romantic drama films
British romantic musical films
Bron Studios films
Canadian musical drama films
Canadian romantic drama films
Canadian romantic musical films
Films based on adaptations
Films based on Cyrano de Bergerac (play)
Films based on musicals
Films directed by Joe Wright
Films impacted by the COVID-19 pandemic
Films produced by Tim Bevan
Films produced by Eric Fellner
Films shot in Sicily
Metro-Goldwyn-Mayer films
Universal Pictures films
Working Title Films films
English-language Canadian films